Paolo dal Pozzo Toscanelli (1397 – 10 May 1482) was an Italian mathematician, astronomer, and cosmographer.

Life 

Paolo dal Pozzo Toscanelli was born in Florence, the son of the physician Domenico Toscanelli and Biagia Mei. There is no precise information on his education and background. Gustavo Uzielli claimed in 1894 that Toscanelli studied at the University of Padua, but modern authors consider this pure conjecture. Toscanelli lived most of his life in Florence, with occasional excursions to Todi and Rome. He is said to have entered into correspondence with scholars around Europe, but his writings have yet to be thoroughly researched.

Thanks to his long life, his intelligence and his wide interests, Toscanelli was one of the central figures in the intellectual and cultural history of Renaissance Florence in its early years. His circle of friends included Filippo Brunelleschi, the architect of the Florence Cathedral, and the philosopher Marsilio Ficino. He knew the mathematician, writer and architect Leon Battista Alberti, and his closest friend was Cardinal Nicholas of Cusa—himself a wide-ranging intellect and early humanist, who dedicated two short mathematical works in 1445 to Toscanelli, and made himself and Toscanelli the interlocutors in a 1458 dialogue titled On Squaring the Circle (De quadratura circuli). When Nicholas of Cusa was on his death bed in the remote Perugian town of Todi in 1464, Toscanelli traversed 120 miles from Florence to be with him.

Toscanelli along with Nicholas of Cusa appears to have belonged to a network of Florentine and Roman intellectuals who searched for and studied Greek mathematical works, along with Filelfo, George of Trebizond, and the humanist Pope Nicholas V, in company with Alberti and Brunelleschi.

Cartography 

In 1439, the Greek philosopher Gemistos Plethon, attending the Council of Florence, acquainted Toscanelli with the extensive travels, writings and mapping of the 1st century BC/AD Greek geographer Strabo, hitherto unknown in Italy. Nearly 35 years later, the Italian was to follow up this amplified knowledge.

In 1474, Toscanelli sent a letter and a map to his Portuguese correspondent Fernão Martins, priest at the Lisbon Cathedral, detailing a scheme for sailing westwards to reach the Spice Islands and Asia. Fernão Martins delivered his letter to the King Afonso V of Portugal, in his court of Lisbon.  The original of this letter was lost, but its existence is known through Toscanelli himself, who later transcribed it along with the map and sent it to Christopher Columbus, who carried them with him during his first voyage to the New World. Toscanelli had miscalculated Asia as being 5,000 miles longer than it really was, and Columbus miscalculated the circumference of the Earth by 25 percent: both of which resulted in Columbus not realizing initially he had found a new continent.

An uncorroborated story links Toscanelli’s attendance at a Chinese delegation to the Pope in 1432, when many Chinese inventions were discussed, with a flood of drawings made around the same year by the artist-engineer Taccola (1382 – c.1453), which were later developed by Brunelleschi and Leonardo da Vinci. In a 1474 letter by Toscanelli to Columbus, the authenticity of which has been a matter of disagreement among scholars, Toscanelli mentions the visit of men from Cathay (China) during the reign of Pope Eugenius IV (1431–1447):

It has been suggested that the man in question may have been Niccolo da Conti, who was returning from the east and is known to have met with Pope Eugenius in 1444.

In a second letter, Toscanelli describes further these men as extremely learned and willing to share their knowledge:

Astronomy 

Toscanelli is noted for his observations of six comets, in 1472, two in 1457, 1456, which was to be named Halley's Comet after Edmond Halley predicted its return in 1759, 1449, and 1433.

This allows for observation for around 35 days either side of the summer equinox.

See also
The Pinzon Brothers
Juan de la Cosa

References

Citations

Bibliography
Armando Cortesão, Cartografia Portuguesa Antiga, Lisboa, 1960.
Armando Costesão, História da Cartografia Portuguesa, 2 vols., Lisboa, 1969–1970.
Davidson, Miles H. Columbus then and now: a life reexamined University of Oklahoma Press, 1997 
G. Uzielli, La Vita e i tempi di Paolo di Pozo Toscanelli, Roma 1894.
Quinn, David B. Quinn The European Outthrust and Encounter: The First Phase c. 1400–c. 1700 Liverpool University Press, 1994 
Markam, Clements R. Journal of Christopher Columbus (During His First Voyage, 1492–93) and Documents Relating to the Voyages of John Cabot and Gaspar Corte Real Ayer Publishing, 1972 
Rahn Phillips, Carla The Worlds of Christopher Columbus Cambridge University Press, 1993 
Kern, Ralf. Wissenschaftliche Instrumente in ihrer Zeit. Vom 15. – 19. Jahrhundert. Cologne: Koenig, 2010. .

External links
 
 
 

1397 births
1482 deaths
Scientists from Florence
15th-century Italian astronomers
Italian Renaissance humanists
15th-century Italian mathematicians
15th-century people of the Republic of Florence